The 2016 World Outdoor Bowls Championship men's triples  was held at the Burnside Bowling Club in Avonhead, Christchurch, New Zealand, from 29 November to 4 December 2016.

The men's triples gold medal went to Andrew Knapper, Jamie Walker and Robert Paxton of England.

Section tables

Section 1

Section 2

Finals

Results

References

Men